{{Infobox venue
| name               = HERE Arts Center
| native_name        = 
| native_name_lang   = 
| image              = File:Dominick St 6th Av td (2018-11-07) 05 - HERE Arts Center.jpg
| image_size         = 
| image_alt          = 
| caption            = 
| image_map          = 
| map_caption        = 
| pushpin_map        = 
| pushpin_map_caption= 
| address            = 145 6th Avenue
| city               = New York City
| country            = United States
| designation        = 
| architect          = 
| owner              = 
| tenant             = 
| operator           = 
| publictransit      = New York City Subway:  at Spring Street at Houston Street at Prince StreetNYCT Bus: 
| capacity           = Mainstage: 150Dorothy B. Williams: 71
| type               = Off-Off-Broadway
| opened             = 1993
| reopened           = 
| yearsactive        = 
| rebuilt            = 
| closed             = 
| demolished         = 
| othernames         = 
| production         = 
| currentuse         = 
| website            = 
}}HERE Arts Center''' is a New York City off-off-Broadway presenting house, founded in 1993. Their location includes two stages specializing in hybrid performance, dance, theater, multi-media and puppetry in addition to art exhibition space and a cafe. Since 1993, HERE reports having supported over 14,000 artists and hosting approximately 1,000,000 audience members.

HERE is located in Hudson Square, SoHo on 145 Avenue of the Americas, New York, between Spring Street and Broome Street. In 2008 the space underwent extensive renovations which saw the venue take its current form.

 History 

Founded in 1993, The New York Times says HERE "has produced innovative new theatrical work since it was founded". Examples include productions of Eve Ensler's The Vagina Monologues, Basil Twist's Symphonie Fantastique, and Young Jean Lee's Songs of the Dragons Flying to Heaven. Work produced and presented at HERE has garnered 13 OBIE awards, an OBIE grant for artistic achievement, a 2006 Edwin Booth Award (“for Outstanding Contribution to NY Theatre”) from the CUNY Graduate Center, three Drama Desk nominations, two Berrilla Kerr Awards, four NY Innovative Theatre Awards and a Pulitzer Prize nomination. In 2005, HERE purchased its long-time home and completed a complete renovation in 2008, all through a five-year, $5 million “Secure HERE’s Future” campaign. There are two theatres, a cafe, gallery, and support spaces.

 Prototype Festival 

January 2013 marked the launch of the PROTOTYPE Opera/Theater/Now festival featuring contemporary artists from around the world. The festival lasts for less than two weeks and works are staged at various venues around New York City. The 2021 Prototype Festival occurred in a digital format.  The 2022 festival had planned to return in person but had to be cancelled due to Covid.

 Significant productions 

 Eve Ensler's The Vagina Monologues Basil Twist's Symphonie Fantastique Hazelle Goodman's On Edge Young Jean Lee's Songs of the Dragons Flying to Heaven Faye Driscoll's 837 Venice Boulevard Basil Twist and Joey Arias's Arias with a Twist Mohammed Fairouz's Sumeida's Song2016 world premiere of Hansol Jung's Among the DeadReferences

 External links 
 
 HERE Theatre Specs from Fractured Atlas SpaceFinder
 PROTOTYPE Festival Homepage
 HERE Overview at NYC Arts
 all wear bowlers'' Official website

Theatres in Manhattan
Performance art in New York City
Theatre companies in New York City
1993 establishments in New York City
SoHo, Manhattan
Arts centers in New York City
Sixth Avenue
Hudson Square